This is a list of submissions to the 36th Academy Awards for Best Foreign Language Film. The Academy Award for Best Foreign Language Film was created in 1956 by the Academy of Motion Picture Arts and Sciences to honour non-English-speaking films produced outside the United States. The award is handed out annually, and is accepted by the winning film's director, although it is considered an award for the submitting country as a whole. Countries are invited by the Academy to submit their best films for competition according to strict rules, with only one film being accepted from each country.

For the 36th Academy Awards, fourteen films were submitted in the category Academy Award for Best Foreign Language Film. Poland and the USSR submitted films to the competition for the first time. Pakistan didn't submit a film again until 2013 with Zinda Bhaag being submitted. The titles highlighted in blue and yellow were the five nominated films, which came from Greece, Italy, Japan, Poland and Spain. Italy won the award for Federico Fellini's film 8½.

Submissions

References

Sources
 Margaret Herrick Library, Academy of Motion Picture Arts and Sciences

36